Richmond's Green or Richmonds Green is a hamlet in the civil parish of Thaxted, and the Uttlesford district of Essex, England. It is  miles south-east from the town of Thaxted. The post town for Richmond's Green is Dunmow.

References 
Essex A-Z (page 13)

Hamlets in Essex
Thaxted